These hits topped the Ultratop 50 in the Flanders region of Belgium in 1988.

See also
1988 in music

References

1988 in Belgium
1988 record charts
1988